Michel Dejouhannet (3 July 1935, in Châteauroux – 11 January 2019) was a French professional road bicycle racer. In 1959, Dejouhannet won a stage in the 1959 Tour de France.

Major results

1958
Bourges
Gouzon
Grand-Bourg
Guéret
La Souterraine
Montmorillon
Puteaux
Quimperlé
Uzerche
La Charité-sur-Loire
1959
Boussac
Circuit de l'Indre
Mauriac
Montluçon
Objat
Puteaux
Vailly-sur-Sauldre
Saint-Macaire en Mauges
Tour de France:
Winner stage 8
1960
Brigueil-le-Chantre
La Clayette
Pléaux
Bain-de-Bretagne
1961
Saint-Pierre le Moutier
1962
La Clayette
Terrasson la Villedieu
1963
Champagné-Saint-Hilaire
1964
Brigueil-le-Chantre
1965
Boucles du Bas-Lim

References

External links 

Official Tour de France results for Michel Dejouhannet

1935 births
2019 deaths
French male cyclists
French Tour de France stage winners
People from Châteauroux
Sportspeople from Indre
Cyclists from Centre-Val de Loire